Guilty Conscience is the third studio album by American recording artist J. Holiday, released by his own label HMG (Holiday Music Group) and Music Line Group on January 28, 2014. It is Holiday's first album since Round 2 (2009), and his first independent release.

The album features production from Lil Ronnie, Ronnie D, Jerry Wonda, Blaq Smurph and Miyk Snoddy, among others. Guilty Conscience receive mostly positive reviews, giving the album 4.5 out of 5 stars.

Release
The first single "After We Fuck" was released on September 23, 2013. In November 2013, Holiday teased a sampler of the album with four snippets and three full tracks available for download at djbooth.net. The album was announced for a December release, but this was pushed back to January 28, 2014. Guilty Conscience hit number 42 on the Top R&B/Hip-Hop Albums chart on February 14. The second single "Incredible", was sent to urban radio on February 17, 2014.

Inspiration 
Three weeks before the album was officially released, J. Holiday explained the concept behind the title, saying:

Track listing

Note
 The track listing was confirmed by Amazon.com.

Credits and personnel 
Credits for Guilty Conscience adapted from Allmusic and album credits.

 Brandon Alexander - bass, instrumentation
 Arden Altino - composer, keyboards, producer
 B.A.M. - composer, producer
 Blaq Smurph - instrumentation, producer
 Phil Cornish - composer, keyboards, producer
 Nealante - producer, mix engineer
 Ronnie D - producer
 Jerry "Wonda" Duplessis - bass, composer, producer
 C. Dwight - composer
 Rod Harris, Jr. - Guitar
 Patrick "Guitarboy" Hayes - composer, guitar, producer
 J. Holiday - primary artist

 Araceli Jackson - A&R
 Ronnie Jackson - composer, executive producer, producer
 Jubu - guitar
 Phillip Lassiter - horn
 Colin Leonard -mastering
 Lil Ronnie - Instrumentation, producer, vocal producer
 Brandyn Porter - guitar
 Miykal Snoddy - composer, producer
 Anthony "T.A." Tate - composer, executive producer, producer
 Zach Wolfe - photography

Charts

Release history

References

2014 albums
J. Holiday albums
Concept albums